Rysakayevo (Rısıqay) is a rural locality (a selo) in Sosnovsky Selsoviet, Beloretsky District, Bashkortostan, Russia. The population was 379 as of 2010. There are 12 streets.

Geography 
Rysakayevo is located 26 km southwest of Beloretsk (the district's administrative centre) by road. Utkalevo is the nearest rural locality.

References 

Rural localities in Beloretsky District